The Testudinaceae are a family of fungi in the order Pleosporales. Taxa have a widespread distribution, especially in xeric habitats, and are mostly saprobic.

References

Pleosporales
Dothideomycetes families
Taxa described in 1971